Andrew John Panko III (born November 29, 1977) is an American former professional basketball player. At 6'9" (2.06 m) tall, he primarily played the small forward and power forward positions.

College career
After playing high school basketball at Bishop McDevitt in Harrisburg, Pennsylvania, Panko played college basketball at Lebanon Valley College.

Professional career
Panko began his professional career in 1999 with the New Mexico Slam of the International Basketball League. He made his NBA debut with the Atlanta Hawks in 2001, playing just one minute in a single game. Panko played for the Dakota Wizards of the Continental Basketball Association (CBA) from 2002 to 2003. He was named the CBA Most Valuable Player and earned All-CBA First Team honors in 2003. He was named the Spanish ACB League MVP in 2012, while playing with San Sebastián Gipuzkoa.

In July 2012, he signed with the Greek Basket League / EuroLeague club Panathinaikos. In December 2012, he was traded to Unicaja Malaga for James Gist. At the end of the season he left Unicaja.

On August 14, 2013, Panko signed with Baloncesto Fuenlabrada for the 2013–14 season. On July 29, 2014, he agreed with Fuenlabrada to play one more season. On May 30, 2015, he signed with Vaqueros de Bayamón of Puerto Rico for the rest of the 2015 BSN season.

On July 17, 2015, Panko signed with French club SLUC Nancy Basket for the 2015–16 season. On May 11, 2016, he re-joined the Vaqueros de Bayamón for the rest of the 2016 BSN season.

On September 12, 2016, Panko signed with Mexican club Fuerza Regia. He helped his team to win the 2016–17 LNBP championship. On April 4, 2017, he signed with Guaros de Lara of Venezuela for the rest of the 2017 LPB season. On July 27, 2017, he re-signed with Fuerza Regia for one more season.

EuroLeague statistics

|-
| style="text-align:left;"| 2012–13
| style="text-align:left;"| Panathinaikos
| 9 || 6 || 24.4 || .473 || .250 || .563 || 4.8 || 1.7 || .2 || .1 || 9.2 || 8.9
|-
| style="text-align:left;"| 2012–13
| style="text-align:left;"| Unicaja Málaga
| 13 || 3 || 23.4 || .275 || .208 || .667 || 3.2 || .8 || .3 || .1 || 4.7 || 1.9
|- class="sortbottom"
| style="text-align:left;"| Career
| style="text-align:left;"|
| 22 || 9 || 23.8 || .370 || .225 || .618 || 3.8 || 1.1 || .3 || .1 || 6.5 || 4.8

Awards and accomplishments

College career
3× NABC First-Team All-American: (1997, 1998, 1999)
3× MAC Most Valuable Player: (1997, 1998, 1999) 
2× Division III National Player of the Year: (1998, 1999)
D3hoops.com All-Decade First Team: (2008)
D3hoops.com Player of the Decade: (2008)
Lebanon Valley College Athletic Hall of Fame: (2009)

Pro career
CBA Champion: Dakota Wizards: (2002)
CBA: All-League Team: (2003)
CBA MVP: (2003)
Spanish Second Division: MVP: (2008)
3× Spanish ACB League Top Scorer: (2012, 2014, 2015)
All-Spanish League Team: (2012)
Spanish ACB League MVP: (2012)

References

External links
 Official Website 
 NBA.com Profile
 NBA Stats
 Euroleague.net Profile
 Eurobasket.com Profile
 FIBA.com Profile
 Draftexpress.com Profile
 Spanish League Profile 
 Greek Basket League Profile 

1977 births
Living people
American expatriate basketball people in France
American expatriate basketball people in Greece
American expatriate basketball people in Italy
American expatriate basketball people in Mexico
American expatriate basketball people in Spain
American expatriate basketball people in Venezuela
American men's basketball players
Atlanta Hawks players
Baloncesto Fuenlabrada players
Baloncesto Málaga players
Basket Napoli players
Basketball players from Harrisburg, Pennsylvania
Bilbao Basket players
Dakota Wizards (CBA) players
Fuerza Regia de Monterrey players
Gipuzkoa Basket players
Greek Basket League players
Guaros de Lara (basketball) players
Lebanon Valley Flying Dutchmen men's basketball players
Liga ACB players
New Mexico Slam players
Panathinaikos B.C. players
P.A.O.K. BC players
Power forwards (basketball)
Real Betis Baloncesto players
SLUC Nancy Basket players
Small forwards
Undrafted National Basketball Association players